Kathryn L. Norsworthy  is an international humanitarian psychologist and a professor of Graduate Studies in Counseling at Rollins College, whose work focuses on aiding women in the pursuant of human rights and leadership goals. In 2017, she was awarded the American Psychological Association (APA)’s International Humanitarian Award in recognition of her humanitarian projects and research in South and Southeast Asia.

Research interests
Norsworthy's work has focused on equality, cross-cultural counseling, social justice  and feminist-liberation projects for the LGBTQ community as well as for women in Nepal, Thailand, Burma South and Southeast Asia, among others.

Awards
She was awarded the APA'S Outstanding International Psychologist Award in 2007, and the Society of Counseling Psychology (SCP)'s Many Faces of Psychology Award in 2008, as well as its Social Justice Award in 2009. In 2009, she also won the Florence L. Denmark and Mary E. Reuder Award for Outstanding International Contributions to the Psychology of Women and Gender. In 2013, she was awarded the American Counseling Association (ACA)'s Kitty Cole Human Rights Award.

Publications
Norsworthy has published multiple works on trauma and recovery. International Handbook of Cross-Cultural Counseling: Cultural Assumptions and Practices Worldwide, which she co-edited with Lawrence H. Gerstein and three other scholars, received the 2010 Ursula Gielen Global Psychology Book Award.

References 

Year of birth missing (living people)
Living people
21st-century American psychologists
Rollins College faculty
Place of birth missing (living people)